Serial Teachers 2 is a 2015 French comedy film directed by  Pierre-François Martin-Laval. It is the sequel to 2013's Serial Teachers (Les Profs).

Cast 
 Kev Adams as Thierry Boulard
 Isabelle Nanty as Gladys
 Didier Bourdon as Serge Cutiro / Tirocu
 Pierre-François Martin-Laval as Antoine Polochon
 Arnaud Ducret as Éric
 Stéfi Celma as Amina
 Gaia Weiss as Vivienne 
 Firmine Richard as Madame Saint-Gilles
 Raymond Bouchard as Maurice
 Fred Tousch as Albert
 Laura Benson as Miss Johns 
 Francis Chapman as Young Prince William
 Uday Singh II as best student

References

External links 
 

2015 films
2015 comedy films
2010s French-language films
French comedy films
Films based on French comics
2010s parody films
French sequel films
Films about education
Live-action films based on comics
2010s high school films
2010s French films